The 1996 Seattle Seahawks season was the franchise's 21st season in the National Football League (NFL), the 21st playing their home games at the Kingdome and the second under head coach head coach Dennis Erickson. They were unable to improve on their 8–8 record, finished the season 7–9, and missing the playoffs for the eighth consecutive season.

Owner Ken Behring unsuccessfully attempted to move the team to southern California. The team was sold to Paul Allen in June 1997.

After the season, the Seahawks would never finish at the bottom of the AFC West again. It would be the final season they finished at the bottom of their division for 25 years.

1996 NFL Draft

Personnel

Staff

Final roster

     Starters in bold.
 (*) Denotes players that were selected for the 1997 Pro Bowl.

Schedule

Preseason

Source: Seahawks Media Guides

Regular season
Divisional matchups have the AFC West playing the NFC Central.

Bold indicates division opponents.
Source: 1996 NFL season results

Standings

Game summaries

Preseason

Week P1: vs. Atlanta Falcons

Week P2: at Oakland Raiders

Week P3: at Indianapolis Colts

Week P4: vs. San Francisco 49ers

Regular season

Week 1: at San Diego Chargers

Week 2: vs. Denver Broncos

Week 3: vs. Kansas City Chiefs

Week 4: at Tampa Bay Buccaneers

Week 5: vs. Green Bay Packers

Week 6: at Miami Dolphins

Week 8: at Kansas City Chiefs

Week 9: vs. San Diego Chargers

Week 10: vs. Houston Oilers

Week 11: vs. Minnesota Vikings

Week 12: at Detroit Lions

Week 13: vs. Oakland Raiders

Week 14 at Denver Broncos

Week 15: vs. Buffalo Bills

Week 16: at Jacksonville Jaguars

Week 17: at Oakland Raiders

References

External links
 Seahawks draft history at NFL.com
 1996 NFL season results at NFL.com

Seattle
Seattle Seahawks seasons
Seattle